Raimo Hirvonen (born 20 July 1957) is a Finnish retired ice hockey defenseman who mainly played for HIFK. He is a two time Liiga champion.

Career 
In 1991 HIFK let Hirvonen play for 4 extra games so he could play his 500th game, those games were his last Liiga games. Overall he played 500 Liiga games and put up 194 points.

References

External links

Living people
1957 births
Finnish ice hockey defencemen
SaPKo players
HIFK (ice hockey) players
People from Savonlinna
St. Louis Blues draft picks
Sportspeople from South Savo